Love's Carnival is a 1930 German drama film directed by Hans Steinhoff and starring Lien Deyers, Mathias Wieman, and Eduard von Winterstein. The film is base upon the play by Otto Erich Hartleben. It was shot at the Babelsberg Studios in Berlin. The film's sets were designed by the art director Robert Herlth.

Plot 
Due to an intrigue, originating from his grandmother and his two cousins, the engagement between the officer Hans and his fiancée Traute breaks up. It is alleged that during his 4-week absence, during which he was away on business, his fiancée is said to have been unfaithful to him. The rumors testify to a love affair with Traute and Oberleutnant Grobitzsch.

As a result, Hans leaves his fiancee and becomes engaged to Hildegard, the daughter of the councilor for commerce Berger. His family is satisfied with this circumstance, as they have apparently achieved their goal of preventing Hans and Traute from marrying.

During a cozy get-together, Hans accidentally learns that his former fiancée, Traute, was not in fact unfaithful to him, but rather that the whole thing was staged. Furthermore, Hans learns that Traute still loves him.

As the film progresses, Hans and Traute get back together; she visits him in his apartment during the carnival that is currently taking place on Shrove Monday. When Traute is alone for a moment, she hears a loud discussion between Hans and Oberleutnant Grobitzsch from the next room. When she heard that Oberleutnant Grobitzsch was making disparaging remarks about her, Traute abruptly opened the door to the next room and accused Hans of having broken his officer's word of honour.

The film ends with both of them taking their own lives.

Cast

See also
Rosenmontag (1924)
Love's Carnival (1955)

References

External links

Films of the Weimar Republic
German drama films
1930 drama films
Films directed by Hans Steinhoff
Remakes of German films
German films based on plays
UFA GmbH films
German black-and-white films
Films shot at Babelsberg Studios
1930s German films
1930s German-language films